Dame Madeleine Julia Atkins,  (born 2 July 1952) is a British academic administrator, scholar of education, and former teacher. Since 2018, she has served as the 9th President of Lucy Cavendish College, Cambridge. She was formerly vice-chancellor of Coventry University, and the Chief Executive of the Higher Education Funding Council for England (2014–2018).

Early life and education
Atkins was born on  2 July 1952. She studied law and history at Girton College, Cambridge, graduating with a Bachelor of Arts (BA) degree in 1974. She then trained as a teacher at Lady Margaret Hall, Oxford, completing a Postgraduate Certificate in Education (PGCE). She obtained a PhD from University of Nottingham in 1982.

Career
Atkins was a school teacher from 1975 to 1979, before leaving to study for a doctorate. She was then a post-doctoral researcher at the University of Nottingham from 1982 to 1983, before joining Newcastle University in 1984 as a lecturer. She was promoted to senior lecturer in 1988, and rose to be pro-vice-chancellor (1998 to 2004).

She was vice-chancellor of Coventry University from 2004 to 2013. She became Chief Executive of the Higher Education Funding Council for England (HEFCE) on 1 January 2014. In 2015, Atkins was paid a salary of between £230,000 and £234,999 by HEFCE, making her one of the 328 most highly paid people in the British public sector at that time. In June 2018, it was revealed by the University and College Union that she received a pay package worth £554,648 in 2017, which represents a 96% increase on the £282,354 paid to her in 2016-17.

In July 2018, it was announced that Atkins would be the next President of Lucy Cavendish College, Cambridge in succession to Jackie Ashley. She took up the post in October 2018, becoming the college's 9th president.

Honours
Atkins was appointed a Commander of the Order of the British Empire (CBE) in the 2012 New Year Honours for services to Higher Education. She was promoted to Dame Commander of the Order of the British Empire (DBE) in the 2019 New Year Honours. She is a Deputy Lieutenant (DL) of the West Midlands.

In 2016, she was elected a Fellow of the Academy of Social Sciences (FAcSS).

References

External links 
 

Living people
Dames Commander of the Order of the British Empire
Academics of Coventry University
Academics of Newcastle University
Alumni of Girton College, Cambridge
Deputy Lieutenants of the West Midlands (county)
Fellows of the Academy of Social Sciences
1952 births
Presidents of Lucy Cavendish College, Cambridge